Second Chance is a novel by Danielle Steel, published by Random House in June 2004. The book is Steel's sixty-third novel.

Synopsis
Editor-in-chief of a successful fashion magazine, Fiona Monaghan lives a high flying life, flitting between cities following her passion for fashion. Fiona is content to live her life with only her dog, Sir Winston shares her bed until she met John Anderson.

After a world wind romance over several continents, Fiona opens up her heart for John, a widowed father of two young adult daughters. As the two plan their life together, it all begins to unravel disastrously from being hated by John's two daughters to ruining a business dinner with John's biggest client. Just as their love seems to be down and out, a surprise event gives them a second chance.

Characters
 Fiona Monaghan
 John Anderson
 Adrian Wicks

Footnotes
http://www.randomhouse.com/features/steel/bookshelf/display.pperl?isbn=9780385336352

2004 American novels
American romance novels

Novels by Danielle Steel
Random House books